The longest word in any given language depends on the word formation rules of each specific language, and on the types of words allowed for consideration.

Agglutinative languages allow for the creation of long words via compounding.   Words consisting of hundreds, or even thousands of characters have been coined.  Even non-agglutinative languages may allow word formation of theoretically limitless length in certain contexts. An example common to many languages is the term for a very remote ancestor, "great-great-.....-grandfather", where the prefix "great-" may be repeated any number of times. The examples of "longest words" within the "Agglutinative languages" section may be nowhere near close to the longest possible word in said language, but is instead a popular example of a text-heavy word.

Systematic names of chemical compounds can run to hundreds of thousands of characters in length. The rules of creation of such names are commonly defined by international bodies, therefore they formally belong to many languages.  The longest recognized systematic  name is for the protein titin, at 189,819 letters.   While lexicographers regard generic names of chemical compounds as verbal formulae rather than words, for its sheer length the systematic name for titin is often included in longest-word lists.

Longest word candidates may be judged by their acceptance in major dictionaries such as the Oxford English Dictionary or in record-keeping publications like Guinness World Records, and by the frequency of their use in ordinary language.

Agglutinative languages

Basque 

Esperanto 
Since Esperanto allows word compounding, there are no limits on how long a word can theoretically become. An example is the 39-letter , meaning "Orange County gun control activist hater". Such clusters are not considered good style (the 8-word alternative  is more standard), but they are permissible under the rules of Esperanto grammar. Hyphens are optional in Esperanto compounds, so  is also technically a valid spelling.

The longest Esperanto roots officially recognized by the Akademio de Esperanto are 13 letters long, shown here with the added substantive "-o" ending:

 (administration),
 (autobiography),
 (discrimination),
 (conservatory),
 (palaeontology),
 (parallelogram), and
 (trigonometry).

The longest word found in the dictionary Plena Ilustrita Vortaro as of its 2020 edition is the 24-letter proper noun  (the German state Mecklenburg-Vorpommern), followed by the 21-letter word  (rations administration).

As of March 2022 the longest word found in the Tekstaro de Esperanto text corpus is the 66-letter word , meaning "first-volapukist-then-esperantist-then-idist-then-again-esperantist", which was used in a review published in Monato in 1997 to describe František Lorenz. However, this word does not follow normal Esperanto word formation rules. Other long words found in Tekstaro de Esperanto that do follow regular word formation include:

 (consisting of 650 000 square kilometers), 33 letters, used in an Esperanto version of an 2011 article by Marc Lavergne in Le Monde diplomatique,
 (tragical-comical-historical-pastorals), 33 letters, used in L. L. Zamenhof's translation of Hamlet,
 (North Atlantic Treaty Organization), 27 letters, more commonly translated with two words: .

Estonian 
 meaning "untiredness of a birthday week graduation party" which is 46 letters. 
31 lettered word of  meaning "morning idyll after the new year".
The word  meaning "the hatch a bullet flies out of when exiting a tunnel" is 24 letters long and a palindrome. It could be one of the longest palindromes.

Finnish 
The longest military term in current use is  "counter-artillery targeting radar systems engineer specialist officer" with 71 characters, with 2 more if grammatically incorrect extra hyphens added for readability are counted. If conjugated forms are allowed, even longer real words can be made. Allowing derivatives and clitics allows the already lengthy word to grow even longer, although the usability of the word starts to degrade. Because Finnish uses free forming of composite words, new words can even be formed during a conversation. One can add nouns after each other without breaking grammar rules.

 and a defunct bar named after it, are the longest place names in use.

Hungarian 
, with 67 letters is the longest word in the Hungarian language and approximately means "you could defragmentation defragmenting impenetrability defragmentation". It is already morphed, since Hungarian is an agglutinative language.

The Hungarian language has many causes for writing words together, but there are a few rules for avoiding undisciplined length, resulting in unreadability.

Words with less than six syllables can be written in one. Agglutinated words have to be separated by one dash, if they are more than six syllables altogether. If there are more than two words that are already written with a dash and we want to add some more, we have to use a new dash to add it (like , meaning "Vitamin C rationing"). If there would be two long words to be written, they are advised to be used separately (possible:  meaning "peace agreement plan elaboration", but advised rather  meaning "the elaboration of the plan of the peace agreement").

The longest dictionary form word is the word , with 21 characters (although it ultimately derives from the word  meaning: "saint" or "sacred"), and it means "desecrated" or "profaned".

Korean 
There is some disagreement about what is the longest word in the Korean language, which arises from misunderstanding of the Korean language.

However, to call this a word would be incorrect. It simply consists of many words which act as adjectives for the one word 대접.

The word , a phonetic transcription of "nicotinamide adenine dinucleotide", has a larger number of syllable blocks (19) but a smaller number of letters (41), but does not qualify as a single word due to the spaces.

In proper nouns, many Korean monarchs have overly long posthumous names built from many different Sino-Korean nouns describing their positive characteristics, for example Sunjo of Joseon, whose full posthumous name is the 77-syllable-block . This is simply writing the phrase in Hanja (Hanzi) 純祖先覺淵德顯道景仁純禧體聖凝命欽光錫慶繼天配極隆元敦休懿行昭倫熙化峻烈大中至正洪勳哲謨乾始泰亨昌運弘基高明博厚剛健粹精啓統垂曆建功裕範文安武靖英敬成孝肅皇帝, being transliterate in Hangul. It is not a single word and does not qualify as a lexical entry.

Mongolian 
A popular example of the longest suffixed word in Mongolian is "" which is 26 letters long. Here is a table showing, with translations, which suffixes are added.

Ojibwe 

This literally translates to "blueberry cooked to jellied preserve that lies in layers in which the face is covered in bread".

Tagalog 
Tagalog can make long words by adding on affixes, suffixes, and other root words with a connector.

This compound word means "to keep making up a lie that causes the most extreme anger while pretending you are not."

Turkish 

Turkish, as an agglutinative language, carries the potential for words of arbitrary length.

, at 70 letters, has been cited as the longest Turkish word.  It was used in a contrived story designed to use this word. The word means "As if you would be from those we can not easily/quickly make a maker of unsuccessful ones" and its usage was illustrated as follows:

         
We are in a teachers' training school that has evil purposes. The teachers who are being educated in that school are being taught how to make unsuccessful ones from students. So, one by one, teachers are being educated as makers of unsuccessful ones. However, one of those teachers refuses to be maker of unsuccessful ones, in other words, to be made a maker of unsuccessful ones; he talks about and criticizes the school's stand on the issue. The headmaster who thinks every teacher can be made easily/quickly into a maker of unsuccessful ones gets angry. He invites the teacher to his room and says "You are talking as if you were one of those we can not easily/quickly turn into a maker of unsuccessful ones, huh?"

Other well-known very long Turkish words are:
 means "As if you are one of those people whom we could not turn into a Czechoslovakian".
 means "As if you are one of the people that we made resemble from Afyonkarahisar". (Afyonkarahisar is a city in Turkey.)

Word formation

Non-agglutinative languages

Afrikaans 
Afrikaans, as it is a daughter language of the Dutch language, is capable of forming compounds of potentially limitless length in the same way as in the Dutch language. According to the Total Book of South African Records, the longest word in the language is
 (136 letters), which means "issuable media conference's announcement at a press release regarding the convener's speech at a secondhand car dealership union's strike meeting". This word, however, is contrived to be long and does not occur in everyday speech or writing.

Arabic 
Currently, the longest word in Arabic is the 15-letter-long word . Which means "Did we ask you to let us drink it?" However, according to some online sources the 16-letter-long word  is the longest word in Arabic meaning "Did we ask  you to let us drink both of them?". Regardless, official sources supporting such a stance cannot be found.

Bulgarian 
The Bulgarian online  etymological dictionary claims that longest word in Bulgarian to be the 39-letter-long ,  introduced in the Constitution of Bulgaria of 1947 (Dimitrov Constitution). The word means "do not perform actions against the constitution" (addressed to more than one person).

Catalan
The longest word in Catalan is considered to be , an adverb meaning "[done in a way that is] against the constitution", however, the scientific word , related to endocrinology, has been proposed by the University of Barcelona to be the true longest word.

Croatian
The 31-letter word is the dative case of  "the throne successor's little wife" which is the diminutive of  "the throne successor's wife."

Czech 
Traditionally, the word  ("of the least cultivable", 28 letters) is considered as the longest Czech word, but there are some longer artificial words. Most of them are compound adjectives in dative, instrumental or other grammatical case and derived from the iterative or frequentative verbal form or the ability adjective form (like "-able").

 (47; Instrumental case of the ones least multipliable by a group of ninety-nine on a regular basis)
 (Those who are the least multiplable by a group ninety-nine on a regular basis)
 (Those who are the most multiplable by a group ninety-nine on a regular basis)
 (Those who are more multiplable by a group ninety-nine on a regular basis)
 (Those who are multiplable by a group of ninety-nine on a regular basis)
 (Alternative of "multiply out by a group of ninety-nine on a regular basis")
 (Multiply out by a group of ninety-nine on a regular basis — continuous grammatical aspect)
 (Multiply by ninety-nine on a regular basis – continuous grammatical aspect)
 (Multiply by a group of ninety-nine once)
 (Multiply by a group of ninety-nine)
 (A group of ninety-nine)
 (Inverse of  = ninety-nine)

Danish 
Danish, like many Germanic languages, is capable of compounding words to create ad hoc compounds of potentially limitless length. Nevertheless, the constructed word  – which means "a period of stabilising the planning of a specialist doctor's practice" – was cited in 1993 by the Danish version of the Guinness Book of World Records as the longest word in the Danish language at 51 letters long. It is however not possible (using Google) to find a text, which actually uses this word, except for in the context of discussing the longest Danish word.

Dutch 
Dutch, like many Germanic languages, is capable of forming compounds of potentially limitless length. The 53-letter word , meaning "preparation activities plan for a children's carnival procession", was cited by the 1996 Guinness Book of World Records as the longest Dutch word.

The entry in the dictionary however is in the singular, counting 35 letters.

The free  dictionary, which has been certified by the Dutch Language Union (the official Dutch language institute) and is included in many open-source applications, contains the following longest words, which are 40 letters long:
 ,  "carriers' liability insurance";
 , "drivers' liability insurance";
 , "conformity assessment procedures" (38 letters)

English 

The 45-letter word  is the longest English word that appears in a major dictionary.  Originally coined to become a candidate for the longest word in English, the term eventually developed some independent use in medicine.  It is referred to as "P45" by researchers.

The 30-letter word pseudopseudohypoparathyroidism refers to an inherited disorder, named for its similarity to pseudohypoparathyroidism in presentation, which is in turn named for its similarity to hypoparathyroidism. This is the longest word that was not contrived with the sole intention of becoming the longest word.

, at 29 letters and meaning the act of estimating something as being worth so little as to be practically valueless, or the habit of doing so, is the longest non-technical, coined word in Oxford Dictionaries of the English language.

, at 28 letters, is the longest non-coined, non-systematic English word in  Oxford Dictionaries. It refers to a 19th-century political movement that opposed the disestablishment of the Church of England as the state church of England.

French

German 
In German, whole numbers (smaller than 1 million) can be expressed as single words, which makes  (777,777) a 65 letter word. A 79 letter word, was named the longest published word in the German language by the 1972 Guinness Book of World Records, but longer words are possible.

The longest word that is not created artificially as a longest-word record seems to be  at 63 letters. The word means "law delegating beef label monitoring" but as of 2013, it was removed from the books because European Union regulations have changed and that particular law became obsolete, leading to news reports that Germany "had lost its longest word".

In December 2016 the 51-letter word  ("deferral of the second iteration of the federal presidential run-off election") was elected the Austrian Word of the Year 2016. The jury called it a "descriptive word" which "in terms of its content as well as its length, is a symbol and an ironic form of commentary for the political events of this year, characterized by the very long campaign for the presidential election, the challenges of the voting process, and its reiteration."

Greek 
In his comedy Assemblywomen (c. 392 BC), Aristophanes coined the 182-letter word , a fictional food dish consisting of a combination of fish and other meat. The word is cited as the longest ancient Greek word ever written.
, 25 letters) meaning "electroencephalogram".

Hebrew 

The longest Hebrew word is the 19-letter-long (including vowels) , which means "And when to our encyclopedias..." The Hebrew word  (encyclopedia) is of a European origin.

The 11-letter-long (including vowels)  is the longest word to appear in the Hebrew Bible. - Its meaning is "And the satraps".  It also does not originate from Hebrew. 

Other very long Hebrew words include:

  meaning: "And when they were having fun" or "And while in their playfulness".

Hindi 
Hindi has a finite list of compound words which are based on established grammatical rules of the language. The word literally means "a green railway warning signboard made of copper-iron". Its plural would be , which has an additional vowel and a diacritic. It is a neologism and not in common use.

It consists of 8 consonants and 5 vowel diacritics, making up a total of 13 characters. The word literally means "confused about what to do", meaning to be bewildered or flabbergasted.

Icelandic 
Icelandic has the ability to form compounds of arbitrary length by stringing together genitives, so no single words of maximal length exist in the language.

Indonesian 
Indonesian is a part of Austronesian language. According from Kamus Besar Bahasa Indonesia.

Irish 

Italian 

The longest word in Italian is traditionally , which is a 26-letter-long adverb. It is formed by subsequent addition of postfixes to the original root:
 : "hasty";
 : "very hasty";
 : "[of someone/something] that acts very hastily", (not grammatically correct);
 : "in a way like someone/something that acts very hastily" (not grammatically correct, but nowadays part of the language).

The word is never used in every-day language, but in jokes. Nevertheless, it is an official part of Italian language; it was coined in 1677 by poet Francesco Moneti:

The word technically violates Italian grammar rules, the correct form being , which is three letters and one syllable shorter. The poet coined the new word to have 11 syllables in the second verse.

Other words can be created with a similar (and grammatically correct) mechanism starting from a longer root, winding up with a longer word. Some examples are:
  (cited by Dante Alighieri in De vulgari eloquentia), 27 letters, "in a way that is more than magnificent by far" (archaic);
 , 27 letters, "in a way that is very difficult to falsify";
 , 27 letters, "in an extremely detailed way";
 , 28 letters, "in a way that strongly violates the constitution".

Other long words are:
  (33 letters - chemical)
  (30 letters - 3D geometric figure)
  (29 letters - surgery)
  (27 letters - medical adverb: electroencephalographically)
  (27 letters - chemical: DDT)

Láadan 

Láadan is not agglutinating as there is no mechanism to combine arbitrary words into one without intermediating grammatical mechanisms (such as the ); however, there are a number of affixes that further elucidate the contextual meaning of a word. These are ignored when determining the longest words in the language. The primary reference for vocabulary is the 3rd edition of the official dictionary and grammar.

 , 22 letters not counting the space, or 17 phonemes (since for example ée is a toneme of e, and th is a separate sound from *t or *h separately—the asterisks indicate that neither sound exists in Láadan) - a set phrase for a wreath of grapevine, a common symbol of the language
 , 14 letters or 10 phonemes - an invited guest

Latin 
The longest attested word in Classical Latin is subductisupercilicarptor, which was coined by the obscure poet Laevius in the 1st century. One can further increase the length of the words by adding the Dative plural case to them, which would result in the words  and  respectively.

Lithuanian 
The longest Lithuanian word is 40 letters long:
  - "in those, of masculine gender, who aren't gathering enough wood sorrel's leaves by themselves anymore." - the plural locative case of past iterative active participle of verb  meaning "to pick wood-sorrels' leaves" (leaves of edible forest plant with sour taste, word by word translation "rabbit cabbage"). The word is attributed to software developer / writer Andrius Stašauskas.

Māori 
The Māori-language 85-letter place name  is the longest place name in English-speaking countries and second longest in the world, according to Wises New Zealand Guide and The New Zealand Herald.

Polish 
Very long Polish words can be created as adjectives from numerals and nouns. For example, 54 letters, is the genitive singular form of an adjective meaning roughly "of nine-hundred and ninety-nine nationalities". Similar words are rather artificial compounds, constructed within allowed grammar rules, but are seldom used in spoken language, although they are not nonsense words. It is possible to make even longer words in this way, for example:

 (176 letters, meaning "of 999,999,999,999 years old").

One of the longest common words is 31-letter  – the dative singular form of "ninety-and-some years old one".

Romanian 

Russian 
It was used in Russian patent RU2285004C2 (granted and published in 2006). This word is an adjective that can describe e.g. a chemical formula. As a noun, it is without the last 4 letters.

It is an adjective in the bureaucratic language of the 19th century "meaning a very polite form of addressing clerks, something like Your Excellency, Your Highness, Your Majesty all together" (Guinness World Records 2003). Its dative singular form,  (with 36 letters) can be an example of excessively official vocabulary of the 19th century.

Sanskrit 
Sanskrit allows word compounding of arbitrary length. Nouns and verbs can be expressed in a sentence.

The longest sentence ever used in Sanskrit literature is (in Devanagari):

In IAST transliteration:

from the Varadāmbikā Pariṇaya Campū by Tirumalāmbā, composed of 195 Sanskrit letters (428 letters in the roman transliteration, dashes excluded), thus making it the longest word ever to appear in worldwide literature.

Each hyphen separates every individual word this word is composed of.

The approximate meaning of this word is:
"In it, the distress, caused by thirst, to travellers, was alleviated by clusters of rays of the bright eyes of the girls; the rays that were shaming the currents of light, sweet and cold water charged with the strong fragrance of cardamom, clove, saffron, camphor and musk and flowing out of the pitchers (held in) the lotus-like hands of maidens (seated in) the beautiful water-sheds, made of the thick roots of vetiver mixed with marjoram, (and built near) the foot, covered with heaps of couch-like soft sand, of the clusters of newly sprouting mango trees, which constantly darkened the intermediate space of the quarters, and which looked all the more charming on account of the trickling drops of the floral juice, which thus caused the delusion of a row of thick rainy clouds, densely filled with abundant nectar."

Slovak 
Traditionally, the word  ("of the least cultivable", 31 letters) is considered as the longest Slovak word, but there are some longer artificial words. Most of them are compound adjectives in dative, instrumental or other grammatical case and derived from the iterative or frequentative verbal form or the ability adjective form (like -able).

Artificial words, lexically valid but never used in language:
 , 40 letters, "through the least crystallised ones"
 , 39 letters
 ,  34 letters 
 ,  33 letters

Artificial words using Slovak towns or places, lexically valid but never used in language:
 , 54 letters
 , 54 letters

Numerals: 
 , 53 letters, "999499" 
 , 53 letters, "797797"

Spanish 

The word  is usually considered the longest word in general use. This word can be made even longer by the addition of the absolute superlative suffix, rendering  (i.e.: "very strongly against the constitution").

Swedish 
 (28 letters) is the longest word in Svenska Akademiens Ordlista.
However, Swedish grammar makes it possible to create arbitrarily long words.

Toki Pona 

The word has since entered into common use, and it has become common to define  more broadly as any animal from the Musteloidea superfamily.

As a minimalistic isolating constructed language, most words in Toki Pona are much shorter, the median being 4 letters. The list of proposed country names in the same book also mentions  ("Papua New Guinea"), which includes a 14-letter proper adjective.

Vietnamese 
Vietnamese is an isolating language, which naturally limits the length of a morpheme. This is the longest word that can be written without a space. However, not all words in Vietnamese are single morphemes.

The written language abounds with compound words in which each constituent word is delimited by spaces, just like any freestanding word. Moreover, the grammar lacks inflection to mark parts of speech, and prepositions are often optional. Therefore, the boundary between a word and a phrase is poorly defined. Examples of this ambiguity include:

 , which literally describes a dish of grilled chicken sauteed with lemongrass and peppers on rice
 , a polite pronoun composed of five kinship terms

Unlike locally coined compound words, compound words in Sino-Vietnamese vocabulary are less ambiguous, because of the use of premodifiers (as in English) as opposed to the native postmodifiers.

Loanwords and pronunciation respellings from other languages can also result in long words. The Encyclopedic Dictionary of Vietnam systematically respells foreign names, introducing long names into an official Vietnamese lexicon:

  ("Komissarzhevskaya", 15 letters)
  ("Rozhdestvensky", 15 letters)
  ("Metropolitan Opera", 18 letters)

Long initialisms in Vietnamese include:

  ("Socialist Republic of Vietnam", 8 characters)
  ("Viet Cong", 10 characters)

In modern Vietnamese, compound words can be identified fairly easily within title cased text: a morpheme that begins with a capital letter followed by one or more morphemes that begin with a lowercase letter. For example,  ("socialism") is capitalized as one component within .

Welsh 
, a railway station on the island of Anglesey in Wales, is the longest place name in the Welsh language. However, it was artificially contrived in the 1860s as a publicity stunt, to give the station the longest name of any railway station in the United Kingdom.

Long words are comparatively rare in Welsh.

  (antidisestablishmentarianism)
  (microcomputers)
  (anticonstitutionalists)
  (semiconductors)
  (they tyrannised)
  (intercession) ( can be added to form the plural, and the word can be further lengthened slightly by initial mutation: , "my intercessions")

See also 
 Morphology (linguistics)
 Longest English sentence
 Coxeter group - mathematical concept whose entities are sometimes called words

References 

Word coinage
Words
 

af:Langste woord